John Oakley (28 October 1834 – 10 June 1890) was Dean of Carlisle and then Manchester in the last quarter of the 19th century.

Born in Frindsbury, Kent, Oakley was educated at Brasenose College, Oxford and ordained in 1858. After curacies at St Luke’s, Berwick Street, and St James, Piccadilly, London, he was then Vicar of St Saviour’s, Hoxton followed by a short spell in Carlisle as Dean of the cathedral followed by a further six years at Manchester, also as dean.

Works

References

1834 births
People from Carlisle, Cumbria
People from Frindsbury
Alumni of Brasenose College, Oxford
Deans of Manchester
Deans of Carlisle
1890 deaths
Presidents of the Oxford Union